Minister of Assistance to the President of the Marshall Islands is a member in the cabinet of Marshall Islands. The person is appointed by the President from among the members of the Nitijela. The person acts as a substitute for the President of the Marshall Islands as his or her vice president.

List of the Ministers of Assistance

References

Government of the Marshall Islands
Politics of the Marshall Islands
Marshall Islands